Starobaltachevo is the name of two rural localities in the Republic of Bashkortostan, Russia:
Starobaltachevo, Baltachevsky District, Republic of Bashkortostan, a selo in Baltachevsky District
Starobaltachevo, Dyurtyulinsky District, Republic of Bashkortostan, a village in Dyurtyulinsky District